Eduard Arzt is an Austrian physicist and materials scientist. He is the recipient of the Gottfried Wilhelm Leibniz Prize, the highest research award of the German Research Foundation (DFG), the Acta Metallurgica Award,  and the Heyn-Award, the highest award of the German Materials Society (DGM). He is a member of the German Leopoldina Academy of Sciences in Halle,  and a corresponding member of the Austrian Academy of Sciences in Vienna. In 2020, Arzt was elected an international member of the US National Academy of Engineering

Biography 
Arzt studied physics and mathematics at the University of Vienna, where he received his Ph.D. in 1980. Subsequent to a postdoctoral appointment at the University of Cambridge, he joined the Max Planck Institute for Intelligent Systems in Stuttgart. In 1989 and 1990 he spent a year as visiting professor at Stanford University. In 1990 he was appointed to the chair for physical metallurgy/metal physics at Stuttgart University, with a joint appointment as director at the MPI for metals research (today the MPI for Intelligent Systems). In 1996 he taught as visiting professor at the Massachusetts Institute of Technology. In 2003 he became managing director at the MPI in Stuttgart. On October 1, 2007, he took the position as scientific director and chairman at Leibniz Institute for New Materials (INM) in Saarbrücken and was appointed professor for new materials at Saarland University. During his directorship, the Leibniz Institute was thematically re-oriented into an interdisciplinary center for modern materials research. Since 2023, Eduard Arzt is Distinguished Visiting Professor in the Department of Mechanical and Aerospace Engineering of the University of California San Diego.

Arzt has an education as concert pianist from Bruckner Musikuniversität in Linz, Austria, and the University of Miami Music School (external). He spent a year as an exchange student at Coral Gables High School, Coral Gables, Florida (1972/73). He is currently president of the Friends of the Saarland Music Festival and holds a PPL-A flight license.

Professional activities

Arzt has been invited for research stays and endowed lectures, i.a., by the Massachusetts Institute of Technology, Cambridge, US, the University of California, Santa Barbara, the University of California, San Diego, the University of Illinois at Urbana–Champaign, Case Western Reserve University, the Technion Israel Institute of Technology, the Chinese Academy of Sciences, and the University of Vienna and Graz Technological University.   He is editor-in-chief of Progress in Materials Science, a  review journal in the field of materials science.

Research areas 
Arzt has worked in numerous fields of  materials science, ranging from high-temperature structural alloys, micro and nanomechanics of thin film materials, mechanisms of electromigration and degradation in miniaturized materials systems to the modeling of materials properties under extreme conditions. His current research focus lies on the synthesis and characterization of bio-inspired adhesive surfaces and their commercialization in robotics and automation. He is co-founder and head of the advisory board of a deep tech start-up in robotics and automation.

Awards and prizes 

 Masing Award, German Materials Society (DGM), 1985
 Heinz Maier-Leibnitz-Preis, German Ministry for Education and Research, 1988
 Acta Metallurgica Outstanding Paper Award, 1990
 Max-Planck-Forschungspreis (with William D. Nix, Stanford), 1990
 Gottfried Wilhelm Leibniz Prize, Deutschen Forschungsgemeinschaft, 1996
 R.S. Williams Lecturer, Massachusetts Institute of Technology, 1996
 Corresponding Member of the Austrian Academy of Sciences, 1997
 Member of Deutsche Akademie der Naturforscher Leopoldina, 2002
 Advanced Grant, European Research Council (ERC), 2013
 Heyn Memorial Coin, DGM, 2017
 Member of the US National Academy of Engineering, 2020

References

External links 
 

Austrian physicists
Gottfried Wilhelm Leibniz Prize winners
University of Vienna alumni
Max Planck Institutes researchers
Massachusetts Institute of Technology faculty
Year of birth missing (living people)
Living people